A shock collar or remote training collar is any of a family of training collars (also called e-collars, Ecollars, or electronic collars) that deliver electrical stimulation of varying intensity and duration to the neck of a dog (they can also be applied to other places on the dog's body, to achieve various training effects) via a radio-controlled electronic device incorporated into a dog collar. Some collar models also include a tone or vibrational setting, as an alternative to or in conjunction with the shock. Others include integration with Internet mapping capabilities and GPS to locate the dog or alert an owner of his/her whereabouts.

Originally used in the late 1960s to train hunting dogs, early collars were very high powered. Many modern versions are capable of delivering very low levels of shock. Shock collars are now readily available and have been used in a range of applications, including behavioral modification, obedience training, and pet containment, as well as military, police and service training. While similar systems are available for other animals, the most common are the collars designed for domestic dogs.

Types of devices

Pet containment systems
The most common use of shock collars is pet containment systems that are used to keep a dog inside the perimeter of the residence without the construction of a physical barrier. This use of shock collars is increasingly popular in areas where local laws or homeowners' associations prohibit the construction of a physical fence. Available systems include: in-ground installation to preserve the aesthetics of the yard; above ground installation to reinforce an existing barrier that was not sufficient in containing the dog; and wireless systems to allow for indoor use. Most pet containment systems work by installing a wire around the perimeter of the yard. The wire carries no current (as opposed to electric fences, which carry a current at high voltage that may be lethal in the event of unauthorized or defective installation or equipment) but forms a closed loop with a circuit box that transmits a radio signal to the receiver collar on the dog. As the dog approaches the perimeter the collar activates.

Bark control collars
Bark control collars are used to curb excessive or nuisance barking by delivering a shock at the moment the dog begins barking. Bark collars can be activated by microphone or vibration, and some of the most advanced collars use both sound and vibration to eliminate the possibility of extraneous noises activating a response.

Training collars or remote trainers
Training collars can be activated by a handheld device. Better quality remote trainers have a large variety of levels and functions, can give varying duration of stimulation, better quality stimulation, and have a beep or vibration option useful for getting the dog's attention.

E-collars may be used in conjunction with positive reinforcement and/or utilizing other principles of operant conditioning, depending on the trainer's methods either as a form of positive punishment, where the correction is applied at the moment an undesired behavior occurs to reduce the frequency of that behavior—or as a form of negative reinforcement, where a continuous stimulation is applied until the moment a desired behavior occurs to increase the frequency of that behavior.

Frame of reference
Electrical shock is the physiological reaction, sensation, or injury caused by electric current passing through the body. It occurs upon contact of a body part with any source of electricity that causes a sufficient current through the skin, muscles, or hair.

Commenting in his textbook on training and behaviour, Steven Lindsay wrote about the public perception of the term "shock" and its application in the description of training aids; "At low levels, the term shock is hardly fitting to describe the effects produced by electronic training collars, since there is virtually no effect beyond a pulsing tingling or tickling sensation on the surface of the skin ... the word shock is loaded with biased connotations, images of convulsive spasms and burns, and implications associated with extreme physical pain, emotional trauma, physiological collapse, and laboratory abuses ... the stimulus or signal generated by most modern devices is highly controlled and presented to produce a specific set of behavioral and motivational responses to it."

In an article for the trade magazine "Office for veterinary service and food control", Dr. Dieter Klein compared the effects of shock collars with other electrical stimulation products; "Modern devices ... are in a range in which normally no organic damage is being inflicted. The electric properties and performances of the modern low current remote stimulation devices ... are comparable to the electric stimulation devices used in human medicine. Organic damage, as a direct impact of the applied current, can be excluded.” 

"At 0.914 joules the electric muscle stimulation and contractions a human receives from an 'abdominal energizer' fitness product is exponentially stronger — more than 1,724 times stronger— than the impulse a dog receives from a pet containment collar set at its highest level."

Technical considerations
Electric shock can be characterised in terms of voltage, current, waveform, frequency (of waveform), pulse rate and duration.
Although voltage, current and duration of shock can be used to calculate the amount of energy applied (in Joules), these are not indicators of the intensity of the stimulus or how it may be perceived by the recipient. Static electric shocks that are experienced in daily life are of the order of 20,000 to 25,000 volts, and yet are not painful or physically damaging because they are of very low current.

Depending on design, e-collars can be set so that the shock delivered is only mildly uncomfortable. Variable settings of this kind are essential, so that the e-collar can be adjusted to the level that the dog requires, as situations change.

E-collars are sometimes referred to as delivering a "static shock"; however, static electricity is direct current and carries little energy (order of millijoules). E-collars make use of alternating current. It is therefore inappropriate to refer to e-collars as delivering a static shock.

Consistent stimulation requires good contact between the collar electrodes and the dog's skin. (The collar must be fitted according to the manufacturer's instructions.) Local humidity and individual variation in coat density, skin thickness and surface conductivity, also affect the delivery of the stimulation.

The waveform, its frequency, the pulse rate, current, voltage and impedance are important determinants of likely response. "Many e−collars appear to shift intensity levels by altering the pulse duration or repetition rate while keeping the output current and voltage relatively constant, depending on the electrode−skin load."

Individual variations in temperament, pain sensitivity and susceptibility to startle of dogs, means that settings must be carefully adjusted to produce a stimulation that is perceived by the dog as only just aversive enough to stop the dog engaging in the unwanted behavior. Normally salient stimuli, such as noises, commands and even shocks, may have no effect on a dog that is highly aroused and focused on an activity such as hunting.

Potential to cause harm
In 1980 (revised 1987), the US Center for Veterinary Medicine (CVM), a branch of the U.S. Food and Drug Administration (FDA), concurred in regulatory action against a manufacturer of a bark collar, stating "Complaints received, which were later corroborated by our own testing, included severe burns in the collar area and possible personality adjustment injuries to the dogs. The shocking mechanism was found to be activated not only by barking but by vehicle horns, slamming doors or any other loud noise. CVM concurred in regulatory action against the device since it was deemed to be dangerous to the health of the animal." The standing policy of the US FDA is that "Dog collars which are activated by the noise of barking to produce an electric shock are considered as hazardous to the health of the animal."

No regulations exist specifying the performance characteristics or reliability of these devices, so there is considerable variation in shock level and waveform characteristics between manufacturers, and perhaps even between batches of collars from a single manufacturer. The lack of regulation or standards, and the fact that some of the safety features of shock collars are patented by specific manufacturers, means that the safety and operational characteristics of individual products cannot be verified.

Training effectiveness

The effectiveness of e-collars is highly debated, with each side having support from activists, scholars, and trainers.

Deterring predation in the wild
The Wildlife Society article addresses the use of shock collars as a way to prevent sheep from being preyed upon by wild coyotes. According to (Phillips, 1999) they tested these collars on coyotes for a four-month period and found that the collars stopped thirteen attacks on sheep herds. This also is said to deter future attacks by the tested coyotes. Collars have also been used on wolves for similar reasons. This document is the assessment of the shock collar on wolves’ long-term behavior. The article talks about trying to alter wolves’ behavior over an extended period of time using the collar. The consensus was while it did have an effect while in use and temporally after it was removed, the study concluded that longer exposure would be needed to have any substantial evidence (Hawley, 2008). As far as non-lethal alternatives these two sources both concluded that shock collars are the most effective deterrence to predators. Both groups continued their research and the Wildlife Society has developed a new and improved version that eliminates the risk of neck injury when used on animals that previous versions caused. They have increased battery life and the durability of the unit. They devised a unit that is worn like a back pack for the animal. Previous versions caused excessive rubbing and soreness as well as being irritating for the animal to the point were they would try to take the harness off.

Scientific studies

Christiansen et al. study (2001a)
Christiansen et al., looked at behavioural differences between three breeds of dogs when confronted by domestic sheep (138 dogs; Elkhounds, hare hunting dogs and English setters). Two testing procedures were used and shock collars were used to deter attacks on sheep. The first, a path test, involved observing the dogs' reactions to a set of novel stimuli (rag pulled across the track, bundle of cans thrown down, tethered sheep at 5m) as it was walked. The second test involved monitoring the dog's reaction to a free-roaming sheep flock in a field. In this study they identified several factors that predicted a high hunting motivation and attack severity. These were lack of previous opportunity to chase sheep, low fearfulness towards gunshots and unfamiliar people and general interest in sheep when encountering them. Younger dogs (<3 years of age) showed more pronounced initial hunting motivation and more frequent attacks. Elkhounds showed more hunting behaviour, more attacks and were more frequently given electric shocks during the tests. A shock collar was used to deter attacks on the sheep during the experiments. Shocks (3000 V, 0.4 A, duration 1 second) were delivered when dogs came within a distance of 1–2 m of the sheep, and were repeated until the dogs left the area. The objective was to suppress an attack, but not to damage the hunting ability of the dogs. Despite frequently initiated chases and attacks, few shocks were delivered. This was because few dogs approached closer than 1–2 m, and the intention was to deter proximity to sheep rather than to associate hunting behaviour with an aversive shock, which would impair future hunting behaviour in other contexts.

Christiansen et al. study (2001b)
The dogs used in the first study were re-tested using the same procedures, to assess long-term impact of the training on their reaction to sheep. Again, in the free-running tests the dogs were fitted with a shock collar, which was used to deter approaches to within 1–2 m of the sheep. Dogs that had previously been shocked in year 1 showed a significant increased in latency to approach a person during the path test ( < 0.001), even though this was not a condition under which shocks had been delivered. Owners reported behavioral differences between year 1 and 2 in 24 of the dogs. 18 of the 24 dogs had shown no interest in sheep during that period, even though they had been interested in them during the first year tests. However, only one of those dogs had received shocks, so the change in behaviour could not be attributed to the use of the shock collar. When comparing owners’ reports for the two years, the dogs showed a weaker inclination for chasing sheep and other prey than previously ( < 0:001), but this variable was not affected by shock experience. Dogs that had shown interest in sheep in year 1 showed a persistent interest in year 2. No dogs chased or attacked sheep as their first response, while half of them did so the first year. During the entire test period, the proportion of dogs attacking sheep was reduced to almost one fourth. The number of shocks administered per dog was reduced by the second year, and only one of the dogs that received shocks the first year needed shocks also the second year. The observations that both receivers and non-receivers of shocks the first year showed a reduction in the probability of chasing sheep, but the receivers showing a larger reduction, show that shock treatment provides an additional learning response. No adverse effects on the dogs were observed with this training procedure, but in their discussion the authors commented "In order to ensure no negative effects, we recommend that the electronic dog collar may be used for such purposes only if it is used by skilled trainers with special competence on dog behaviour, learning mechanisms, and of this particular device."

Salgirli dissertation (2008)
The aim of Salgirli's study was "...to investigate whether any stress is caused by the use of specific conditioned signal, quitting signal, and/or pinch collars as alternatives to electric training collars, and if they do so, whether the stress produced in the process is comparable to the one with electric training collars.". The study population were a group of 42 adult police dogs. The quitting signal was a conditioned frustration equivalent to negative punishment. It was conditioned by associating failure to obtain an anticipated food reward with a specific vocal signal. In the test, dogs were walked past a "provocateur" who attempted to taunt the dog into a reaction. If the dog reacted, it was punished, and if it failed to react on subsequent provocations then the punishment was deemed to have had a learning effect. The study is therefore a comparison of negative and positive punishment methods, and not a comparison of punishment with positive reinforcement. Learning effect was measured by assessing the number of dogs that learned to quit a behaviour after application of the punishing stimulus. There was no statistical difference in learning effect between the pinch and shock collar, but the quitting signal produced a significantly poorer learning effect compared to shock or pinch collars ( < 0.01 in both cases). "Although the pinch collar caused more behavioral reactions, in the form of distress, than the electronic training collar, the electronic training collar elicits more vocal reactions in dogs than the pinch collars"; the explanation for increased vocalisation in the shock collar group was that this was due to a startle response rather than pain reactions.

Salivary cortisol was monitored to measure the stress levels of the dogs, but this data was not presented in the dissertation; behavioral observation was the sole measure of stress. The study concluded that the electronic training collar induces less distress and shows stronger “learning effect” in dogs in comparison to the pinch collar. Commenting on the quitting signal, the author stated "It should particularly be mentioned, that the quitting signal training was implied only on adult dogs within the frame of this study. Therefore, the results should not be interpreted as that the quitting signal can not be a suitable method in police dog training. As previously stated training of the quitting signal requires a hard and a structured procedure. Thus, if the training, namely the conditioning, begins in puppyhood, the quitting signal can also be an effective method in police dog training". Comparing the effects of the three punishment methods; "These results can probably be explained by that electronic training collar complies completely with the punishment criteria, which were defined by TORTORA (1982), in case of proof of the proficient and experienced user. On the other hand, when applying the pinch collar, these criteria can not be met even though perfect timing is applied since reactions of the dog and effectiveness of the method depends on several different factors such as the willingness, strength and motivation of the handler, as well as his/her proficiency. In addition to that, the visibility of the administrator and, thus, of the punishment is another important factor influencing the efficiency of the pinch collar because the dog directly links the punishment with its owner. Therefore, this method does not satisfy the ‘‘punishment criteria’’ at all. The quitting signal on the other hand requires criteria, such as good timing and structured training procedure, on account of complete conditioning to achieve effective results. Even if these criteria are met, the personality trait of the dog is another factor, which influences the efficiency of the signal."

Schalke et al. study (2007)
Schalke et al. conducted a 7-month study to investigate the effect of shock collars on stress parameters, in a series of different training situations. Heart rate and saliva cortisol were used to determine the stress levels in three groups of dogs. Group A received the electric shock when they touched the "prey" (a rabbit dummy attached to a motion device), Group H ("here" command) received the electric shock when they did not obey a previously trained recall command during hunting, and Group R (random) received random shocks that were unpredictable and out of context. Group A did not show a significant rise in cortisol levels; the other two groups (R & H) did show a significant rise, with group R showing the highest level of cortisol. Salivary cortisol was measured, as this procedure is less likely to cause stress related rise in cortisol.

From this the researchers concluded that the dogs who could clearly associate the shock with their action (i.e. touching the prey) and as a result were able to predict and control whether they received a shock, did not show considerable or persistent stress. The evidence of increased stress in the other groups was felt to support earlier findings that poor timing and/or inappropriate use of a shock collar puts the dog at high risk of severe and ongoing stress. They conclude that "The results of this study suggest that poor timing in the application of high level electric pulses, such as those used in this study, means there is a high risk that dogs will show severe and persistent stress symptoms. We recommend that the use of these devices should be restricted with proof of theoretical and practical qualification required and then the use of these devices should only be allowed in strictly specified situations."

Schilder & van der Borg study (2004)
Schilder and van der Borg conducted a study to compare the behavior of police service dogs that had previously been trained using a shock collar (Group S) with those that had not (Group C). In the training test no shocks were applied, but the animal's behavior was observed during training tasks. The intention was to investigate whether shock collar based training might have a long-term effect on stress-related behavior even in the absence of shock, and whether this related to specific features of the training context. Behaviors recorded included recognised indicators of stress (panting, lip-licking, yawning, paw lifting and body posture) as well as yelping, squealing, snapping and avoidance. During free walks on the training grounds, groups S dogs showed significantly more stress related behaviors and a lower body posture than group C dogs. During training, the same differences were found. The difference between the groups was more significant when training took place on the familiar training ground, indicating a contextual effect. The presence of the trainer was considered to be part of this context. The authors concluded "We concluded that shocks received during training are not only unpleasant but also painful and frightening."

Lindsay says of this study, "Schilder and Van der Borg (2004) have published a report of disturbing findings regarding the short-term and long- term effects of shock used in the context of working dogs that is destined to become a source of significant controversy.... The absence of reduced drive or behavioral suppression with respect to critical activities associated with shock (e.g., bite work) makes one skeptical about the lasting adverse effects the authors claim to document. Although they offer no substantive evidence of trauma or harm to dogs, they provide loads of speculation, anecdotes, insinuations of gender and educational inadequacies, and derogatory comments regarding the motivation and competence of IPO trainers in its place."

Steiss et al. study (2007)
Steiss, et al., conducted a four-week study of adult shelter dogs’ physiological and behavioral responses to bark control collars. Plasma cortisol was used as the stress measure. Dogs were randomly assigned to either a shock collar, a spray collar, or a dummy collar (control group). Dogs that were known to bark at an unfamiliar dog were used for the study. Test conditions involved presentation of an unfamiliar dog. Dogs wore activated collars for period of 30 minutes per day for three days in two consecutive weeks. The amount of barking was significantly reduced starting on the second day with both the spray and shock collars. There was no significant difference in effect between the two collar types. The treatment group dogs showed a mild yet statistically significant increase in blood cortisol level (an indicator of stress) only on the first day of wearing the collars (as compared to the Control Group.) At the conclusion of the study, Dr. Steiss and her team concluded that "In the present study, with dogs wearing bark control collars intermittently over a 2-week period, the collars effectively deterred barking without statistically significant elevations in plasma cortisol, compared to controls, at any of the time points measured."

Tortora Study (1983)
Tortora applied a method called "safety training" to treat aggression in 36 cases exhibiting a form of "instrumental aggression", selected after screening a population of 476 cases. "Instrumental aggression" was defined as describing aggressive acts that "do not have a clear evolutionary significance, are not directly related to emotional arousal, do not have specific releasing stimuli, are not directly modulated by hormones, and do not have an identifiable focus in the brain". Tortora states that in the context of the article "instrumental aggression" was specifically defined as "aggressive responses that have "a specifiable learning history, show a growth function over time and are modulated by their consequences. These dogs had few operant alternatives to gain reinforcement by compliance and were channeled down a path that allowed their innate aggressiveness to come under the control of the negatively reinforcing contingencies in the environment". The dogs initially behaved as though they "expected" aversive events and that the only way to prevent these events was through aggression. The dogs were therefore a highly selected subset that had not learned strategies for coping with threat.

Each dog was trained to respond to a set of 15 commands taken from the AKC standard for CDX obedience. The commands were selected to provide control over the dog, and included "heel", "stand" "go", "come", "hold", "drop" and "sit". These behaviors were termed "safety behaviors". Training was divided into 9 stages, each of which was composed of 5–20 twice daily training sessions. Dogs could only progress to the next stage after passing a test. On average, dogs took 10–15 sessions to complete each stage. After training on basic commands, the dogs were trained to perform the behaviors they had already learned in order to avoid progressively increasing electric shock. After that, they were conditioned to perform a safety behavior to avoid a "safety tone" that let them anticipate the shock. In later stages of training, dogs were exposed to provocation by a distractor dog, and were punished using full intensity shock if they failed to perform a safety behavior or showed aggression. After training was complete, and the dogs were choosing to perform the safety behaviors instead of aggression, owners were taught to use the shock collar, and the training was transferred into everyday situations. The training resulted in a long-lasting and complete suppression of aggressive behaviour in the dogs. Dogs were followed up three years after the end of training, and the reduction in aggression was maintained.

Criticism
PETA (People for the Ethical Treatment of Animals) opposes the use of shock collars, stating "Dogs wearing shock collars can suffer from physical pain and injury (ranging from burns to cardiac fibrillation) and psychological stress, including severe anxiety and displaced aggression. Individual animals vary in their temperaments and pain thresholds; a shock that seems mild to one dog may be severe to another. The anxiety and confusion caused by repeated shocks can lead to changes in the heart and respiration rate or gastrointestinal disorders. Electronic collars can also malfunction, either administering nonstop shocks or delivering no shocks at all".

CABTSG (The Companion Animal Behaviour Therapy Study Group), an affiliate group of the BSAVA (British Small Animal Veterinary Association), produced a policy statement on the use of shock collars, stating "Their effectiveness depends upon the pain and fear experienced by the animal, but to use them correctly requires detailed understanding of behaviour and its motivation, as well as very precise timing. Few operators are able to achieve any reliable success with these devices and the consequences of failure can be a worsening of the problem behaviour. The indiscriminate use of shock collars therefore poses a threat to the safety of the general public, as well as to the welfare of the animal. We believe that sufficient alternative methods of treatment exist that such electronic training devices are redundant. Therefore, as an association affiliated to BSAVA, it is our duty to recommend that shock collars and all other related training and control aids should be banned from sale or use. CABTSG has been renamed the British Veterinary Behaviour Association.

The BSAVA produced a position statement on the risks associated with collars "The British Small Animal Veterinary Association (BSAVA) recommends against the use of electronic shock collars and other aversive methods for the training and containment of animals. Shocks and other aversive stimuli received during training may not only be acutely stressful, painful, and frightening for the animals, but may also produce long-term adverse effects on behavioural and emotional responses.".

On the advice of the RSPCA (Royal Society for the Prevention of Cruelty to Animals) and other welfare groups, the ACPO (Association of Chief Police Officers) banned the use of shock collars for police dog training by all UK police forces. The current ACPO Police Dogs Manual of Guidance states "Equipment that is not approved for use in the training of police dogs includes remote training collars designed to give an electric shock and Pinch Collars".

The RSPCA commissioned a review of the effects of shock collars from the Department of Veterinary Medicine at Bristol University, which is available online. It states "Given the lack of scientific evidence for the efficacy of behavioural modification using shock collars, particularly in the long term, in addition to the potential for mistakes or deliberate abuse and the difficulty in correcting such errors, the widespread use of these devices must be carefully considered."

The UK Kennel Club has an ongoing campaign to achieve a ban on the sale and use of shock collars; "The Kennel Club is against the use of any negative training methods or devices. The Kennel Club believes that there are many positive training tools and methods that can produce dogs that are trained just as quickly and reliably, with absolutely no fear, pain, or potential damage to the relationship between dog and handler." "The Kennel Club in calling upon the Government and Scottish Parliament to introduce an outright ban on this barbaric method of training dogs.".

The two British members of the World Union of German Shepherd Clubs (WUSV) have joined the Kennel Club in calling for a complete ban on shock collars, and passed a motion to exclude this equipment from any of its training branches during official club training times.

The HSUS (Humane Society of the United States) provides the following comment on the use of aversive collars (choke chains, pinch collars and shock collars): "Some trainers use aversive collars to train "difficult" dogs with correction or punishment. These collars rely on physical discomfort or even pain to teach the dog what not to do. They suppress the unwanted behavior but don't teach him what the proper one is. At best, they are unpleasant for your dog, and at worst, they may cause your dog to act aggressively and even bite you. Positive training methods should always be your first choice." They go on to comment on shock collars specifically: "The least humane and most controversial use of the shock collar is as a training device. The trainer can administer a shock to a dog at a distance through a remote control. There is a greater chance for abuse (delivery of shocks as punishment) or misuse (poor timing of shocks). Your dog also may associate the painful shock with people or other experiences, leading to fearful or aggressive behavior".

The NCAE (Norwegian Council on Animal Ethics) "recommends the introduction of a ban electric training collars and similar remote-controlled or automatic electronic devices that cause your dog substantial discomfort. It should nevertheless be granted an exemption for such training carried out by authorized persons in order to prevent hunting of livestock and wildlife."

The APDT (Association of Professional Dog Trainers) says, "[Electronic] training collars should not be used by novice dog owners or by trainers who are not properly instructed in their use. Use of electronic training collars can result in trauma to your dog and generally are not recommended by positive reinforcement trainers".

The AVSAB (American Veterinary Society of Animal Behavior) produced a position statement titled The use of punishment for behavior modification in animals, the opening paragraph of which reads, "AVSAB's position is that punishment (e.g., choke chains, pinch collars, and electronic collars) should not be used as a first-line or early-use treatment for behavior problems. This is due to the potential adverse effects which include but are not limited to: inhibition of learning, increased fear-related and aggressive behaviors, and injury to animals and people interacting with animals."

Praise
In his 2005 textbook on training and behavior, Steven Lindsay writes "Instead of instilling social aversion and anxiety ... animal and human research supports the notion that competent shock [collar] training appears to promote positive social attachment, safety, and reward effects that may be provided and amplified via affectionate petting and reassuring praise. The preponderance of scientific evidence suggests that [electrical stimulation] escape/avoidance and pain reduction should promote long-term effects that are incompatible with fear and stress, making the trainer an object of significant extrinsic reward that actually enhances the dog's welfare via an improved capacity for social coping, learning, and adaptation". Steven Lindsay states "If minimizing the intensity, duration, and frequency of aversive stimulation during training is recognized as a significant factor in the definition of humane dog training, then the radio controlled e-collar must be ranked as one of the most humane dog-training tools currently available".

The International Association of Canine Professionals released a statement on the matter:

Randall Lockwood PhD, Vice President for Research and Educational Outreach of the Humane Society of the United States, was quoted in a 2007 White Paper as writing "We recognize that older products were often unreliable and difficult to use humanely. But we feel that new technology employed by responsible manufacturers has led to products that can be and are being used safely and effectively to preserve the safety and well-being of many dogs and strengthen the bond with their human companions." The White Paper was titled "The Facts About Modern Electronic Training Devices" and produced by Radio Systems, a manufacturer of shock collars.

Legal status

Regions where shock collars are banned 
Shock collars are banned in:

 Wales
 Germany
 The Netherlands
 Austria
 The Nordic countries (Denmark, Finland, Iceland, Norway, Sweden)
 Some regions of Australia (New South Wales, South Australia, and the Australian Capital Territory)
 Some regions of Spain (Madrid, Barcelona, Castilla-La Mancha, and Galicia)
They will be banned in Flanders in Belgium after 2027. Automatic anti-barking shock collars are banned in Switzerland.

Legal cases involving shock collars
In 2001, a British woman was prosecuted after one of her dogs attacked and killed a Shih Tzu whilst on a walk. A control order, rather than a destruction order, was imposed as the magistrates accepted the defense that the dog's aggressive behaviour was attributable to the effects of the shock collar. The defendant claimed her dogs "connected the pain of the electric shock with little dogs because of the first time I used the collar". She first shocked the dogs accidentally while they were walking by a small dog.

In 2002, the Royal Society for the Prevention of Cruelty to Animals (RSPCA) in Victoria, Australia lost a defamation lawsuit to a shock collar manufacturer and was ordered to pay AUD100,000 in damages. The RSPCA was found to have falsely claimed that shock collars can cause burns, deliver 3,000 volt shocks to dogs, and that the current from a shock collar had caused a 60 kilogram dog to perform backflips and resulted in brain damage. RSPCA's claims that these collars caused epileptic fits, vomiting, seizures, burning and bleeding was also found to be misleading. The RSPCA's senior inspector had falsified evidence in an attempt to demonstrate that shock collars can cause burns.

In 2010, after the Welsh Assembly voted to ban the use of shock collars in Wales, it was unsuccessfully challenged by Petsafe, a manufacturer of these devices, and the Electronic Collar Manufacturers' Association, who claimed that it breached Article 1 of the First Protocol of the European Convention of Human Rights (concerning the right to property).

In 2011, a Welsh man became the first person convicted of illegal use of a shock collar in Wales, receiving a fine for £2,000.

References

External references
.
.
.
.
.
.

Dog training and behavior
Abuse
Cruelty to animals